Androgen deficiency is a medical condition characterized by insufficient androgenic activity in the body. Androgenic activity is mediated by androgens (a class of steroid hormones with varying affinities for the androgen receptor), and is dependent on various factors including androgen receptor abundance, sensitivity and function.

Signs and symptoms
Symptoms of the condition in males consist of loss of libido, impotence, infertility, shrinkage of the testicles, penis, and prostate, diminished masculinization (e.g., decreased facial and body hair growth), low muscle mass, anxiety, depression, fatigue, vasomotor symptoms (hot flashes), insomnia, headaches, cardiomyopathy and osteoporosis. In addition, symptoms of hyperestrogenism, such as gynecomastia and feminization, may be concurrently present in males.

In females, hypoandrogenism consist of loss of libido, decreased body hair growth, depression, fatigue,  vaginal vasocongestion (which can result in cramps), vasomotor symptoms (e.g., hot flashes and palpitations), insomnia, headaches, osteoporosis and reduced muscle mass. As estrogens are synthesized from androgens, symptoms of hypoestrogenism may be present in both sexes in cases of severe androgen deficiency.

Causes
Hypoandrogenism is primarily caused by either dysfunction, failure, or absence of the gonads (hypergonadotropic) or impairment of the hypothalamus or pituitary gland (hypogonadotropic). This in turn can be caused by a multitude of different stimuli, including genetic conditions (e.g., GnRH/gonadotropin insensitivity and enzymatic defects of steroidogenesis), tumors, trauma, surgery, autoimmunity, radiation, infections, toxins, drugs, and many others. It may also be the result of conditions such as androgen insensitivity syndrome or hyperestrogenism. Old age may also be a factor in the development of hypoandrogenism, as androgen levels decline with age.

Diagnosis
Diagnosis of androgenic deficiency in males is based on symptoms together with at least two measurements of testosterone done first thing in the morning after a period of not eating. In those without symptoms, testing is not generally recommended. Androgen deficiency is not usually checked for diagnosis in healthy women.

Treatment

Treatment may consist of hormone replacement therapy with androgens in those with symptoms. Treatment mostly improves sexual function in males.

Gonadotropin-releasing hormone (GnRH)/GnRH agonists or gonadotropins may be given (in the case of hypogonadotropic hypoandrogenism). The Food and Drug Administration (FDA) stated in 2015 that neither the benefits nor the safety of testosterone have been established for low testosterone levels due to aging. The FDA has required that testosterone pharmaceutical labels include warning information about the possibility of an increased risk of heart attacks and stroke.

See also

References 

Endocrine gonad disorders
Male genital disorders
Animal reproductive system
Intersex variations